The Bank of Valencia was the sixth bank in Spain, and had its headquarters in the city of Valencia, Valencia. It was founded on March 20, 1900, and its first president Jose Tartiere Lenegre. Ten years later, the bank already appeared in the Industrial and Commercial Guide of Valencia. In 1927 he assumed the presidencia of the entity Vincent Bonora Noguera, a year later inaugurate the central office on the street Alfredo Calderon of Valencia. A year later, the bank bought the Bank of Castellon.

In 1936 the institution opened an office in San Sebastian. In 1940 there was a change of president, bowing to the post Antonio Noguera Bonora, a post that was occupied in 1954 by Ignacio Villalonga Villalba. In the 1950s became popular collection calendars issued by the entity. In 1964 he entered the office of president Joaquin Rodriguez Reig.

In 1974 the bank launched its Computing Center, and in 1978 its first office in Madrid. In 1984 he returned to have a new change in the presidency, and the new president Antonio Girona Busutil. In late 1980, in 1989 the bank reached 230 offices. In the years 1990 1993 1994 1997 Antonio J. Jimenez Tirado. Following a course of expansion, the Bank of valence purchased in 1997 the Bank of Murcia, although the merger occurred in 2002. That same year, the Bank of Valencia opened its first store bag.

By the year 2000 the entity celebrated its centenary with the organization of various events and celebrations. The number of offices of the entity reached 350 in 2003. In 2004, to be President of the Generalitat Valenciana, Jose Luis Olivas Martinez took the helm of the institution.

In November 2011, the bank was taken over by the Spanish government, after the bank failed to meet adequate Tier 1 capital ratios.

References

Defunct banks of Spain
Banks established in 1900